Naanum Oru Thozhilali is a 1986 Indian Tamil-language masala film directed and produced by C. V. Sridhar. The film stars Kamal Haasan and Ambika, while Jaishankar, V. S. Raghavan and Devika play supporting roles. The film was also simultaneously shot in Telugu as Andarikante Ghanudu. Murali Mohan plays supporting role in Telugu version. Tamil version film was released on 1 May 1986.

Plot 

Bharath returns to India from his studies abroad after his father Yoganand dies in a car accident. The family's factory is run by the father and son team of Rammohan and Sundar. They are looting from the factory and treating the workers poorly. Kumar works at the factory and often clashes with Rammohan and Sundar. The duo accused Kumar's older brother of running away with stolen company cash but Kumar does not believe this. He is also suspicious of Yoganand's death and is trying to investigate.

Bharath falls in love with factory worker Meena, soon after his arrival in India. He also quickly realises that something is amiss with the factory and his father's accident. With the help of Meena, he poses as factory worker Raju to investigate matters. He soon learns that Kumar is an ally and the two work together to get to the bottom of the mystery.

Cast 

 Kamal Haasan as Bharath/Raju
 Ambika as Meena
 Jaishankar as Sundar
 Rajeev as Kumar
 Murali Mohan (Telugu version)
 V. S. Raghavan as Rammohan
 Veera Raghavan as Yoganand
 Vennira Aadai Moorthy as Pakkiri's assistant
 Loose Mohan as Pakkiri
 T. K. S. Chandran
 Prasad Babu
 Thara Krishnan
 C. R. Vijayakumari as Kumar's sister in law
 Devika as Bharath's mother
 Sadhana as Padma
 Vijaya
 Deepa in a special appearance for Mandaveli song

Production 

The film was launched by C. V. Sridhar in 1980 as a Cinemascope venture and was then titled as Sakthi. Sridhar collaborated with Kamal Haasan after the success of the 1978 film Ilamai Oonjal Aadukirathu. The film was meant to be the first film which featured Haasan and Ambika as a lead pair and stills were released featuring Ambika in a swimsuit. The film got delayed and was put on hold, before it re-emerged in 1986 under the title of Meendum Suryodayam (Sunrise Again) and shooting progressed. It was planned for an April 1986 release, which got postponed to 1 May 1986. There was a local council election in March 1986 and the Dravida Munnetra Kazhagam (DMK) won seats. Sridhar felt the title Meendum Suryodayam would imply that the filmmakers were welcoming the DMK's re-emergence, whose symbol is that of a rising sun. Hence the title was changed to Naanum Oru Thozhilali. Sridhar had previously started a film with the same title in the mid-1970s, with M. G. Ramachandran in the lead; that film was shelved.

Soundtrack 
The music was composed by Ilaiyaraaja, with lyrics by Vaali.

Release and reception 
Naanum Oru Thozhilali released on 1 May 1986 alongside Sridhar's other film Yaro Ezhuthia Kavithai and it became a rare incident when two films of the same director were released simultaneously. The Telugu-language version Andarikante Ghanudu released one year later on 3 July 1987. The film was also dubbed in Kannada as Sooryodaya, but that did not have a theatrical release. Jayamanmadhan of Kalki criticised the director for assuming that Haasan, Ambika, the stunts and songs were enough for the film's success as audiences would not feel the same.

References

External links 
 
 

1980s masala films
1980s multilingual films
1980s Tamil-language films
1980s Telugu-language films
1986 films
Films directed by C. V. Sridhar
Films scored by Ilaiyaraaja
Films with screenplays by C. V. Sridhar
Indian multilingual films